The Lenham School is a coeducational secondary school and sixth form located in Lenham, Kent, England. It opened in 1952, as Swadelands School, and provides a secondary education for 788 boys and girls aged 11 to 18 years.

Ofsted published a report in 2010 which detailed their findings as satisfactory, with a proven ability to attain a rating of good with continued improvement. In 2012, Ofsted returned to assess the ICT subject, which was awarded a rating of good. Later in 2015 however, the school's overall effectiveness was rated as "inadequate" by Ofsted, the report stating that "the proportion attaining five good GCSE grades, including in English and mathematics, is significantly below the national average and has declined recently." It also mentioned that the "teaching, learning and assessment are inadequate. Teaching does not motivate pupils well...many staff lack confidence in the school’s leaders". Consequently, the government now considers the school to be "well below national average".

The Lenham School holds several national quality standards and awards including the Artsmark Gold Award, Healthy Schools Award, and Eco Schools Silver Award.

In 2011, the school achieved their best ever GCSE results with 55% of students achieving five A*–C grades including English and Mathematics, with 87% of students achieving five A*–C grades overall. 2012 saw further improvements.

In January 2017, it was announced by the headmaster, that the school would be converting to Academy status, and at the same time changing its name from 'Swadelands School' to 'The Lenham School'.

References

External links
 Old school website
 January 2012 – July 2012 Newsletter
 2012–2013 School Prospectus

Secondary schools in Kent
Educational institutions established in 1952
1952 establishments in England
Academies in Kent